The 1934 French Championships (now known as the French Open) was a tennis tournament that took place on the outdoor clay courts at the Stade Roland-Garros in Paris, France. The tournament ran from 23 May until 2 June. It was the 39th staging of the French Championships and the second Grand Slam tournament of the year. Gottfried von Cramm and Margaret Scriven won the singles titles.

Finals

Men's singles

 Gottfried von Cramm (GER) defeated  Jack Crawford (AUS) 6–4, 7–9, 3–6, 7–5, 6–3

Women's singles

 Margaret Scriven (GBR) defeated  Helen Jacobs (USA) 7–5, 4–6, 6–1

Men's doubles
 Jean Borotra /  Jacques Brugnon defeated  Jack Crawford /  Vivian McGrath  11–9, 6–3, 2–6, 4–6, 9–7

Women's doubles
 Simonne Mathieu  /  Elizabeth Ryan defeated  Helen Jacobs /  Sarah Palfrey Cooke  3–6, 6–4, 6–2

Mixed doubles
 Colette Rosambert /  Jean Borotra  defeated  Elizabeth Ryan /  Adrian Quist  6–2, 6–4

References

External links
 French Open official website

French Championships
French Championships
French Championships (tennis) by year
French Championships (tennis)
French Championships (tennis)
French Championships (tennis)